Kai Ryssdal (born October 8, 1963) is an American radio journalist and the host of Marketplace, a business program that airs weekdays on U.S. public radio stations. He also co-hosts the spinoff podcast Make Me Smart with Kimberly Adams.

Marketplace is produced and distributed by American Public Media. Ryssdal took over in August 2005, replacing David Brown. Before hosting Marketplace, he was host of the Marketplace Morning Report, a seven-minute business roundup, as well as the weekend program Marketplace Money.

Early life and education
Ryssdal is from Briarcliff Manor, New York. His surname is Norwegian, as his father was born in Norway. He spent several years of his childhood in England and Denmark before moving back to the United States at age eight, living in Westchester County, New York. He graduated from Emory University with a Bachelor of Arts degree in History in 1985. Ryssdal received his Master of Arts in National Security Studies from Georgetown University in 1993.

Career 

After graduating from college, Ryssdal spent eight years in the United States Navy, first flying a Northrop Grumman E-2 Hawkeye from the aircraft carrier , and later as a Pentagon staff officer. After earning his Master's degree, Ryssdal joined the U.S. Foreign Service, serving in Ottawa, Ontario, Canada, and Beijing, China.

After leaving the Navy, Ryssdal worked at a Border's Books & Music location in Palo Alto, California for $7 an hour.

Before joining Marketplace, Ryssdal was a reporter and substitute host for The California Report, a news and information program distributed to public radio stations throughout California by KQED-FM in San Francisco.

The Radio and Television News Directors Association and the national Public Radio News Directors Association have honored him with awards for his radio work.

References

External links
 
 

1963 births
20th-century American naval officers
American people of Norwegian descent
American Public Media
American public radio personalities
Emory University alumni
Walsh School of Foreign Service alumni
Living people
People from Briarcliff Manor, New York
Place of birth missing (living people)
United States Foreign Service personnel
United States Naval Aviators
United States Navy officers